In Situ was a restaurant located inside the San Francisco Museum of Modern Art.  The concept was conceived by Corey Lee (chef), who is also the owner and chef of the nearby 3-Michelin-star-rated Benu.

Unlike many fine dining restaurants, which seek to create unique culinary offerings, In Situ based its menu on detailed reconstructions of signature dishes by other chefs from other restaurants.  Lee's role in the restaurant is described in press coverage as both chef and curator. In 2021, the restaurant announced the end of its five-year operating term at SFMOMA.

Critical response
In Situ received positive reviews in its first year of operation.  It was named the "restaurant of the year" by the San Francisco Chronicle and "America's Most Original New Restaurant" by The New York Times. It was also awarded a Michelin star in 2017  and a James Beard Restaurant Design Award in 2018.

References

External links
 

Restaurants in San Francisco
Restaurants established in 2016
2016 establishments in California